Kathryn Jane Cook  (née Smallwood; born 3 May 1960) is a former elite athlete, specialising in sprint and sprint relays. She is one of the most successful female sprinters in British athletics history. She is three-times an Olympic bronze medallist, including at 400 metres in Los Angeles 1984. Her other individual achievements include winning the 200m at the 1981 Universiade, finishing second in the 100m at the 1981 World Cup, and winning a bronze medal in the 200m at the 1983 World Championships. She is also three-times a winner of the British Athletics Writers' Association Female Athlete of the Year Award (1980–82).

Cook held the UK National records for 100m, 200m and 400m for over 25 years. Her 100m best of 11.10secs, stood as the UK record from 1981–2008. Her 200m best of 22.10 secs, stood as the UK record from 1984-2015. She had first broken the 200m record in 1979. Her 400m best of 49.43, stood as the UK record from 1984–2013. She had first broken the 400m record in 1982. In the sprint relay, along with Heather Hunte, Bev Goddard and Sonia Lannaman, she set the UK record with 42.43 at the 1980 Moscow Olympics, which stood as the UK record until 2014. She is also a former holder of the World Best for 300m, running 35.46 in 1984.

Career
Cook was born Kathy Smallwood in Winchester, Hampshire, England. She attended the Hurst Community School, Baughurst and later Queen Marys Sixth form college (QMC), Basingstoke. She was a member of the Reading Athletic Club and later the Wolverhampton & Bilston Athletics Club. She was coached throughout her career by Jim Spooner. She also spent time working at the Tadley branch of Lloyds Bank.

Her first major competition was the 1977 European Junior Championships in Donetsk, where she won three medals, bronze in the 100 & 200 metres and a silver in the sprint relay. In 1978, she competed at the Commonwealth Games in Edmonton and the European Championships in Prague. In Edmonton, representing England, she finished fifth in the 200 metres final in 22.95, narrowly missing a medal, before winning gold in the 4 × 100 m relay with Sharon Colyear, Beverley Goddard and Sonia Lannaman. In Prague, representing Great Britain, the same quartet won a silver medal in the sprint relay. In 1979, at the World Student Games (Universiade) she won three silver medals. In the 100 metres she finished second behind Marlies Gohr in 11.27, while in the 200 metres she was second to another East German great, Marita Koch, in a PB of 22.70. She also won a silver medal in the 4 × 100 m relay.
 
Smallwood competed at her first Olympic Games in Moscow 1980, reaching the finals of both the 100 and 200 metres. In the 100 metres, she was sixth in 11.28 secs, while in the 200 metres, she finished fifth in 22.61. She then teamed up with Heather Hunte, who had also reached the 100 m final and Beverley Goddard and Sonia Lannaman, who had both also reached the 200 m final, to win the bronze medal in the 4 × 100 m relay, in a UK record time of 42.43. A record that stood until 2014. Only one week after the Olympics, she broke the UK record for the 200 metres, with 22.31 in London.

Smallwood won her biggest individual title in 1981, winning the 200 metres at the World Student Games in Bucharest, in 22.78 secs. She also won a silver medal in the 4 x 100 relay. Later that year, at the IAAF World Cup, she came in as a late replacement for Sweden's Linda Haglund, to run for Europe in the 100 metres. She finished second to Evelyn Ashford in a UK record time of 11.10, defeating Marlies Gohr, who was third. This would stand as the UK record for 27 years, until Montell Douglas ran 11.05 in 2008. Also in 1981, Smallwood had her first attempt at the 400 m distance. At a meeting in London, she finished second to the world number one that year, Jarmila Kratochvilova, running 51.08.

In August 1982, at the European Championships in Athens, Smallwood broke her own UK 200 m record with 22.13 secs, to finish a close second to Olympic Champion Bärbel Wöckel, who ran 22.04. She won another silver in the sprint relay, along with Wendy Hoyte, Bev Callender (Goddard) and Shirley Thomas. In September, she added the UK 400 m record to her 100 & 200 m records, running 50.46 in London. Then in October, at the Commonwealth Games in Brisbane, she won another silver medal in the 200 metres, in a wind assisted 22.21, being edged out of victory by Jamaica'a Merlene Ottey, who ran 22.19. She did win a gold medal in the sprint relay with Hoyte, Callender and Sonia Lannamann. In 1983, now competing as Kathy Cook, she won two medals at the inaugural World Championships in Helsinki. On day one of the championships, she won a silver medal in the sprint relay, alongside Joan Baptiste, Bev Callender and Shirley Thomas. She then won the bronze medal in the 200 metres in 22.37, behind Marita Koch and Merlene Ottey and ahead of Florence Griffith.

In 1984, probably Cook's finest season, she won a further two bronze medals at the Los Angeles Olympics. In the 400 metres, she smashed the UK and Commonwealth record with 49.43 secs, behind the American pair of Valerie Brisco-Hooks and Chandra Cheeseborough. This would remain the UK record for almost 30 years, until Christine Ohuruogu ran 49.41 to win at the 2013 World Championships. Cook then narrowly missed winning a medal in the 200 metres final, where she improved her own national record to 22.10. With a strong late surge, she closed rapidly on Florence Griffith and Merlene Ottey-Page, who won silver and bronze in 22.04 and 22.09 respectively. The race was won by 400m champion, Valerie Brisco-Hooks. Cook's 22.10, stood as the UK record for over 30 years, until Dina Asher-Smith ran 22.07 for fifth at the 2015 World Championships. In the sprint relay, drawn in lane one, she collected another bronze medal, along with Simmone Jacobs and two of her Moscow teammates, Bev Callender (Goddard) and Heather Oakes (Hunte). They ran 43.11 At the end of the 1984 season, Cook ranked 10th on the world all-time lists for both the 200m and 400m and would remain in the all-time top ten until 1986 (200) and 1988 (400).

Shortly after the Los Angeles Olympics, Cook won in London over 300 metres, edging out Chandra Cheeseborough. Both were given the time of 35.46 secs, which broke the world best for the rarely contested distance. The mark would remain a world outdoor best until 2003, when Ana Guevara ran 35.30, although it is worth noting that Marita Koch ran a sub 35 sec 300 m split, on her way to her 47.60 world 400 m record in 1985. 1984 would prove to be the peak of Cook's career.

In 1985, her 200 metres season's best was 22.87 for fifth in the European Cup, while in 1986, she failed to run below 23 seconds. She did still manage to win four medals at that years Commonwealth Games in Edinburgh. She won bronze in the 400 metres, behind Australia's Debbie Flintoff and Jillian Richardson of Canada, silver in the 200 metres, behind Canadian Angella Issajenko, gold in the 4 × 100 m relay, with Paula Dunn, Joan Baptiste and Heather Oakes and ended the games with a silver medal in the 4 × 400 metres relay, with Jane Parry, Linda Keough and Angela Piggford.

The Great Britain and England Women's 4 × 100 m relay teams won a medal at eight consecutive Olympic (1980, 1984), World (1983), European (1978, 1982), and Commonwealth Championships (1978, 1982, 1986). Cook was the only woman to be a member of every squad. The run ended at the 1986 Europeans, when the British quartet (again, including Cook) was fifth.  She always ran the second 'leg', her rangy gait (she is 5'11' tall) and speed endurance being ideal for this position. She also occasionally competed in the 4 × 400 metres relay. She won a total of sixteen senior national titles during her career.

In the 1986 New Year Honours, Cook was appointed Member of the Order of the British Empire (MBE) for services to athletics.

Cook remains the only British athlete (male or female) to have reached Olympic finals at 100 metres, 200 metres and 400 metres. Her accomplishments are all the more significant because many of her rivals after the fall of the "Iron Curtain" were found to have been performing illegally. She retired in 1987, after competing at the UK Championships.

Later career
Cook is currently a PE teacher at Mayfield Preparatory School, in Walsall, England. Married since 1982 to Garry Cook, they have three children, a daughter and two sons.

In 2011, she was inducted into the England Athletics Hall of Fame. She received an Honorary Doctorate from the University of Wolverhampton in 2013.

Personal bests
 100 metres – 11.10 secs Rome 5 September 1981 (Former UK record 1981–2008) ran a wind-assisted 11.08 (25 August 1984 Zurich)
 200 metres – 22.10 Los Angeles 9 August 1984 (UK record Aug 1984- Aug 2015)
 300 metres – 35.46 London (Crystal Palace) 18 August 1984 (UK record, former World Best 1984–2003)
 400 metres – 49.43 Los Angeles 6 August 1984 (Former UK record 1984–2013)
 4 × 100 metres relay – 42.43  Moscow 1 August 1980 (Former UK record 1980–2014, with Heather Hunte, Beverley Goddard and Sonia Lannaman)

National titles
11 AAAs National titles:
 4 Times 100 m Champion 1978, 80, 83, 84 ( 2nd in 79, 85 )
 6 Times 200 m Champion 1978, 79, 80, 82, 84, 85
 400 m Champion 1986
5 UK National titles:
  100 m Champion 1983 ( 3rd in 79, 80 )
4 Times 200 m Champion 1980, 83, 85, 86 ( 2nd in 79, 3rd in 77, 78 )

International competitions

At the 1981 World Cup, Smallwood-Cook was representing Europe.
The 1983 European Cup was held one week after the World Championships.

References

External links

1960 births
Living people
Sportspeople from Winchester
British female sprinters
English female sprinters
Members of the Order of the British Empire
Olympic athletes of Great Britain
Olympic bronze medallists for Great Britain
Olympic bronze medalists in athletics (track and field)
Athletes (track and field) at the 1980 Summer Olympics
Athletes (track and field) at the 1984 Summer Olympics
Medalists at the 1980 Summer Olympics
Medalists at the 1984 Summer Olympics
Commonwealth Games gold medallists for England
Commonwealth Games silver medallists for England
Commonwealth Games bronze medallists for England
Commonwealth Games medallists in athletics
Athletes (track and field) at the 1978 Commonwealth Games
Athletes (track and field) at the 1982 Commonwealth Games
Athletes (track and field) at the 1986 Commonwealth Games
Universiade medalists in athletics (track and field)
World Athletics Championships athletes for Great Britain
World Athletics Championships medalists
European Athletics Championships medalists
Alumni of Brunel University London
Universiade gold medalists for Great Britain
Universiade silver medalists for Great Britain
Medalists at the 1979 Summer Universiade
Olympic female sprinters
People associated with the University of Wolverhampton
Medallists at the 1978 Commonwealth Games
Medallists at the 1982 Commonwealth Games
Medallists at the 1986 Commonwealth Games